Andrea Fuentes Fache (born 7 April 1983 in Valls, Tarragona) is a Spanish swimming coach and former synchronised swimmer. She is the most decorated swimmer in the history of the Spanish national team, with four Olympic, 16 World Championship and 11 European Championship medals: her four Olympic medals also make her the most decorated Spanish female Olympian of all time, alongside Arantxa Sánchez Vicario and Mireia Belmonte.

Career
She joined the national synchronised swimming team in 1999. Andrea has competed at the 2004, 2008 and 2012 Summer Olympics, where she has won four medals in the women's duet and women's team events. She retired from elite competition in January 2013, citing demotivation as a result of a conflict between the Royal Spanish Swimming Federation and the head coach of the national team, Ana Tarrés. Since retiring she has become a synchronised swimming coach.

Coaching
, Fuentes became the USA senior national team head coach, working alongside Reem Abdalazem. The two have a pre-established work relationship, having worked together in synchro for four years. 

In June of 2022, Fuentes was poolside coaching during the 2022 World Aquatics Championships in Budapest in which the USA team was competing. Artistic swimmer Anita Alvarez fainted and sank to the bottom of the pool. Fuentes dove in to bring her to the surface. Medical checks after the rescue showed that Alvarez had apparently recovered and planned on continuing to compete.

Personal life
In 2014 Fuentes gave birth to a son, Kilian, from her relationship with gymnast and fellow Olympian Víctor Cano. Her sister Tina Fuentes, also a synchronized swimmer died in 2018 at the age of 34.

See also
 List of Olympic medalists in synchronized swimming

References

External links
Andrea Fuentes official site
London 2012 profile 

Spanish synchronized swimmers
Olympic synchronized swimmers of Spain
Synchronized swimmers at the 2004 Summer Olympics
Synchronized swimmers at the 2008 Summer Olympics
Synchronized swimmers at the 2012 Summer Olympics
Olympic silver medalists for Spain
Olympic medalists in synchronized swimming
1983 births
Living people
Olympic bronze medalists for Spain
Medalists at the 2012 Summer Olympics
Medalists at the 2008 Summer Olympics
People from Valls
Sportspeople from the Province of Tarragona
World Aquatics Championships medalists in synchronised swimming
Synchronized swimmers at the 2011 World Aquatics Championships
Synchronized swimmers at the 2009 World Aquatics Championships
Synchronized swimmers at the 2007 World Aquatics Championships
Synchronized swimmers at the 2005 World Aquatics Championships
Synchronized swimmers at the 2003 World Aquatics Championships
Synchronized swimmers at the 2001 World Aquatics Championships
Spanish swimming coaches
Synchronized swimming coaches